An unlimited company or private unlimited company is a hybrid company (corporation) incorporated with or without a share capital (and similar to its limited company counterpart) but where the legal liability of the members or shareholders is not limited: that is, its members or shareholders have a joint and several non-limited obligation to meet any insufficiency in the assets of the company to enable settlement of any outstanding financial liability in the event of the company's formal liquidation.

Characteristics
The joint and several non-limited liability of the members or shareholders of such an unlimited company to meet any insufficiency in the assets of the company (to settle its outstanding liabilities if any exist) applies only upon the formal liquidation of the company. Therefore, prior to any such formal liquidation of the company, any creditors or security holders of the company may have recourse only to the assets of the company, not those of its members or shareholders.

Until such an event occurs (formal liquidation), an unlimited company is similar to its counterpart—the limited company, in which its members or shareholders have no direct liability to the creditors or security holders of the company during its normal course of business or existence.

Unlimited companies are found in the United Kingdom, Ireland, Hong Kong, Pakistan, Nigeria, India, Australia, New Zealand and other jurisdictions where the company law is derived from English law. They can also be found in Germany, France, Macao, Czech Republic and in three jurisdictions in Canada (Alberta, British Columbia, and Nova Scotia), where they are called unlimited liability corporations. In the United Kingdom, the "private unlimited company" is formed or incorporated by registration under the Companies Act 2006, of which there are a few thousand such companies on the register, similar in volume to the public limited company, but in contrast to the millions of private limited companies registered.

An unlimited company has the benefit and status of incorporation, the same as its limited company counterpart. Situations for which an unlimited company will be preferred to an alternative business model or its limited company counterpart include these:
 secrecy concerning financial affairs is desired, effectively shielding and protecting its financial affairs from public, media and competitor analysis, making them non-public information, including shareholder dividend payments: a United Kingdom unlimited company, unlike its limited company counterpart, is by the very nature of its legal liability generally not required to publish or make public its company financial statements (file its annual financial accounts at Companies House).
 the company is active or trading in an area where limited liability is not acceptable, vital or practical, but perpetual succession is important.
 extending, in general, a greater assurance and confidence to creditors and trade financial transactions, in contrast to its limited company counterpart.
 there is a low risk of insolvency for creditors.
 the company or its trading activities has or generates sufficient capital, funds or financing without need to approach general lenders such as high-street retail banks.
 developing more advantageous company and business capital strategies in an ever-increasing irreversible trend of bank disintermediation by companies and their management.
 a focused higher standard of board of directors and executive management behaviour (or probity) and business model for risk management.
 a flow-through entity is required for United States federal tax purposes, under the entity classification rules.

Once formed or incorporated, an unlimited company can, in some jurisdictions, also re-register and designate itself to limited company status at any time with few formalities, the same also extending to a limited company, which may at any time re-register and designate itself to unlimited company status.

Examples

United Kingdom
An unlimited company in most jurisdictions is not required under company law to add or state the word Unlimited or its abbreviations (Unltd., Ultd., UC or ULC) at the ending of its legal company name, making its formation status not easily recognisable without first reviewing its certificate of incorporation or government registry status. , 10,890 unlimited companies were incorporated in the UK and listed in the publicly available Companies House database.

Notable examples in the United Kingdom include the following:

 the UK subsidiary of the international retail clothing group C&A (UK company number 00524665)
 Land Rover (UK company number 04019301), formerly an unlimited company until 4 October 2013  
 GlaxoSmithKline Services Unlimited (UK company number 01047315) part of GlaxoSmithKline plc
 The Equitable Life Assurance Society (UK company number 00037038)
 Credit Suisse International (UK company number 02500199), the United Kingdom investment banking arm of Credit Suisse
 the publishing company of British author Ian McEwan (UK company number 07473219)
 C. Hoare & Co (UK company number 00240822), England's oldest privately owned bank
 Coutts & Co (UK company number 00036695), a private bank incorporated in 1692 and now part of NatWest Group
 The Office of David Cameron (UK company number 10421190), a company for the business affairs of the former UK Prime Minister David Cameron, was incorporated in 2016 as a private limited company but has been an unlimited company since 15 April 2020.)

The directors of an unlimited company are not generally required to file annual accounts.

Republic of Ireland
In the Republic of Ireland, local subsidiaries of a number of American companies have registered as private unlimited companies, enabling them to shield their finances from public disclosure, media and competitor analysis. Janssen Pharmaceutical, a subsidiary of its US parent company Johnson & Johnson, re-registered as an unlimited company to avoid the requirement to file annual financial accounts at the Companies Registration Office (CRO) of Ireland, thereby effectively also protecting a portion of Johnson & Johnson's financial information. A number of Irish European Union subsidiaries of Apple Inc. did the same, such as Apple Sales International and Apple Retail Europe, as have a number of other Irish European Union subsidiaries of American companies, such as Etsy, Google, Dropbox, LinkedIn and Airbnb Ireland UC.

Other regions
Some other global trading companies such as Mobil Producing Nigeria Unlimited (a subsidiary of Exxon Mobil) and Texaco Overseas (Nigeria) Petroleum Company Unlimited (part of the merged Chevron and Texaco petroleum conglomerates) exist in Nigeria, amongst others. In the USA, another example is the American Express Company, which once was a publicly traded unlimited liability company, re-incorporating itself with limited liability company status only in 1965.

References

Types of business entity